Chulpasia is an extinct genus of Eocene marsupial related to today's shrew opossums. Its diet probably included seeds, small fruits, and insects. Fossils were found in the Muñani Formation in present-day Peru.

Australian conundrum 
In 2009 Bernard Sigé et al. described a marsupial fossil found on the Eocene Murgon fossil site, Queensland. Referring to the specimen as Chulpasia jimthorselli, they exhibited this find as an example of Gondwanan faunal interchange between South America and Australia during the early Paleogene.

However, more recent re-evaluations showcase that this specimen has nothing referrable to Chulpasia or any of its close relatives, and instead identified it as a metatherian incertae sedis. For now, the genus, as well as paucituberculates in general, remain exclusively South American.

References 

Prehistoric marsupial genera
Eocene marsupials
Eocene genus extinctions
Eocene mammals of South America
Itaboraian
Paleogene Peru
Fossils of Peru
Fossil taxa described in 1993